Ali Hajiloo (born 23 March 1946) is an Iranian wrestler. He competed in the men's freestyle 82 kg at the 1972 Summer Olympics.

He also participated three times at the World Wrestling Championships from 1970 to 1973 and failed to win a medal but he won a silver medal at the 1970 Asian Games in Thailand.

References

External links
 

1946 births
Living people
People from Ardabil
Iranian male sport wrestlers
Olympic wrestlers of Iran
Wrestlers at the 1972 Summer Olympics
Medalists at the 1970 Asian Games
Asian Games medalists in wrestling
Wrestlers at the 1970 Asian Games
Asian Games silver medalists for Iran